"Ulah Havasi" (Turkish:Vlachs Dance) is a Turkish and Vlachs folkloric musical piece from the album Music of the Sultans, Sufis & Seraglio, Vol. 2 - Music of the Dancing Boys.  The piece is performed by the Lalezar Ensemble.

See also
Zaharoula
Orfeon Records

References

External links

https://www.vmrebetiko.gr/item/?id=4330
https://www.vmrebetiko.gr/item/?id=10078
https://www.vmrebetiko.gr/item/?id=5410
https://www.vmrebetiko.gr/item/?id=4339
https://www.vmrebetiko.gr/item/?id=4654

Turkish songs
Songwriter unknown
Year of song unknown